Lotf Ali Gavar (also Romanized as Loţf ‘Alī Gavāber; also known as Loţf ‘Alī Gavār) is a village in Otaqvar Rural District, Otaqvar District, Langarud County, Gilan Province, Iran. At the 2006 census, its population was 94, in 23 families.

References 

Populated places in Langarud County